Møme (born 28 July 1989 as Jérémy Souillart) is a French DJ from Nice. His most successful single was "Aloha", which charted at a peak of 10 in France. In October 2016, Møme was confirmed to play at the 31st edition of Eurosonic Noorderslag in Groningen, NL.

Discography

Albums

Singles

Promotional Singles

References	

French electronic musicians
People from Nice
1989 births
French DJs
Living people
Electronic dance music DJs